Badminton was contested at the 2017 Summer Universiade from August 23 to 29 in Taipei, Taiwan, in the Taipei Gymnasium. Men's and women's singles, men's, women's, and mixed doubles, and mixed team events will be contested.

Participating nations

Medal summary

Medal table

Medal events

References

External links 
2017 Summer Universiade – Badminton
Result book – Badminton

 
2017
Universiade
2017 Summer Universiade events
Badminton tournaments in Taiwan